Titmouse, Inc. is an American animation studio that develops and produces animated television programming, feature films, music videos, title sequences, commercials, and short films. The studio opened in 2000, and has offices in Los Angeles, New York City, and Vancouver.

Many of their productions include Breadwinners and Baby Shark's Big Show! for Nickelodeon, Motorcity for Disney XD, Big Mouth and The Midnight Gospel for Netflix, Metalocalypse, The Venture Bros., Superjail!, King Star King, Ballmastrz: 9009 and Black Dynamite for Adult Swim, Megas XLR and Mao Mao: Heroes of Pure Heart for Cartoon Network, the 2020 revival of Animaniacs for Warner Bros. Animation and Hulu, Moonbeam City for Comedy Central, Hanazuki: Full of Treasures for Hasbro, Bless the Harts for Fox, Turbo Fast and The Epic Tales of Captain Underpants for DreamWorks Animation Television, Star Trek: Lower Decks for Paramount+, The Legend of Vox Machina and Fairfax for Amazon Prime Video.

History 
Founder and CEO Chris Prynoski began working at MTV in New York on shows such as Daria, Beavis and Butt-Head, and his own creation, Downtown, which was nominated for a primetime Emmy Award. In the early 2000s, Prynoski opened a small T-shirt company with his wife, Shannon Prynoski. However, upon getting more requests for cartoons than for T-shirts, they decided to abandon screen-printing in favor of animation. The Prynoskis moved to California, and opened the revamped Titmouse, Inc., an animation studio. Antonio Canobbio, who had worked with Chris Prynoski at MTV and both Prynoskis at Cartoon Network in L.A., was hired as creative director. Titmouse opened a games division in 2009.

Due to projects like Cartoon Network's Metalocalypse, Superjail! and The Venture Bros. the company expanded and opened a sister studio in New York City in 2010. The California studio later added a wholly owned subsidiary, Robin Redbreast, which was then unionized in order to produce Motorcity for Disney XD.

The company has a YouTube channel, Rug Burn, launched in December 2012 with 6 Point Harness. Rug Burn was launched with a handful of shows.

In April 2016, Titmouse released its first feature-length film, the R-rated Nerdland, which stars Paul Rudd and Patton Oswalt.

In October 2020, Titmouse Vancouver became the first animation studio in Canada to join a union. Following a vote that captured 87% of the workforce, 98% of Titmouse Vancouver's workforce voted to join the newly founded Animation Guild IATSE Local 938.
In response to this, some said that the issues raised by the workers of Titmouse were the same ones heard "from unrepresented animation workers everywhere" and that the unionization of the Titmouse workers acknowledges the contributions by animation workers to the industry.

In January 2022, the employees of Titmouse New York formed a union with Animation Guild IATSE Local 839, the first to do so outside of Los Angeles County in more than 70 years. In the card check process, Titmouse NY employees showed more than 90% of support for the organizing effort. Following the union becoming public, Titmouse management chose to voluntarily recognize the union and agreed to negotiate with the Animation Guild in good faith.

Filmography

Television

Feature films

Short films

Video games
 Guitar Hero III: Legends of Rock (cinematics; 2007)
 Guitar Hero Aerosmith (intro and outro cinematics; 2008)
 Guitar Hero World Tour (cinematics; 2008)
 Guitar Hero: Metallica (cinematics; 2009)
 Guitar Hero Smash Hits (cinematics; 2009)
 Marvel Heroes (opening cinematic; 2013)
 The Legend of Korra (cinematics; 2014)
 Soundfall (trailer; 2018)
Indivisible (opening cinematic (Co-animated with Trigger); 2018)
Speed Brawl (animated launch trailer; 2018)
Apex Legends ("Stories from the Outlands: A Father's Letter"; 2019)
SpongeBob SquarePants: Battle for Bikini Bottom – Rehydrated (teaser; 2019)
Hi-Fi Rush (cinematics; 2023)

Commercials

 Budweiser (2001) (produced for Class-Key Chew-Po)
 Minute Maid Light (2004) (produced for Ka-Chew!)
Hi Hi Puffy AmiYumi (produced for Ka-Chew!)
 Nickelodeon (2005) (produced for Ka-Chew!)
 Fuel TV (2006) (produced for Ka-Chew!)
 MTV
 VH1
 Total (2007)
 Nesquik (2007)
 Honda Odyssey (2007)
Get Him to the Greek (2010)
 Ovi by Nokia (2010)
 Cocoa Puffs (2011)
 K-Swiss
League of Legends
 Cartoon Network
 Adult Swim
 Totino's
 Stride (2016)
 Lord Miller (2016)
 Schick Hydro
 Domino's Pizza
 Nike
 Visa Inc. (2017)
Clash Royale
 Chobani Gimmies (2019)
 Paramount+ (2021)
 Annecy International Animation Film Festival (2021)
 One Campaign (2021)
 Hearthstone (2021)
 Hulu (2022)
 Heinz (2022)
 Nissan/Google (2023)

Notes

References

External links
 
 Sean Cubillas, The 10 Greatest Cartoons Made By Titmouse Studios, According To IMDb, Comic Book Resources

American companies established in 2000
Entertainment companies established in 2000
Mass media companies established in 2000
American animation studios
Adult animation studios
Companies based in Los Angeles